Agha Hilaly (20 May 1911 – 6 February 2001) was one of Pakistan's senior most diplomats who held several high offices in the Government of Pakistan, including Pakistan's Ambassador to the United States from 21 October 1966 to 20 October 1971.

Career and family background
Hilaly was born in 1911 in Bangalore. He joined the Indian Civil Service in 1936 at the age of 25,  and opted for Pakistan during  the independence of Pakistan in 1947 and settled in Pakistan along with his family in 1947. As the Government of Pakistan was in the process of establishing its foreign service cadre, all officers of the Civil Service of Pakistan that succeeded the Indian Civil Service were encouraged to join the new cadre. Hilaly was one of the first to do so and played an important role in shaping the strategic dimensions of Pakistan's foreign policy.

He was Pakistani Ambassador to the Scandinavian countries with residence in Stockholm from 1956 to 1959. In 1959 he was appointed Ambassador to Moscow and concurrently to Prague, until 1961, when he was assigned to India.

While representing Pakistan at the United Nations and serving as Ambassador to the United States. In the latter position, he facilitated the secret visit of US Secretary of State Henry Kissinger to China, a fact acknowledged by President Richard Nixon. His younger brother Agha Shahi also an ICS officer followed in his footsteps and rose to be Foreign Minister of Pakistan. One of their uncles Sir Mirza Ismail served as Diwan Prime Minister of the princely state of Mysore, Jaipur and Hyderabad, India from 1926 to 1947.  His nephew Akbar Mirza Khaleeli was a prominent Indian Diplomat and served as Indian Ambassador to Iran, Italy and Australia and was Advisor to the Indian Government on Middle Eastern Affairs. His son Zafar Hilaly is also a former ambassador of Pakistan.

Death
Agha Hilaly died in Karachi on 6 February 2001, at the age of 89.

References

1911 births
2001 deaths
Politicians from Bangalore
Muhajir people
Pakistani Shia Muslims
Ambassadors of Pakistan to the United States
Ambassadors of Pakistan to the Soviet Union
Indian Civil Service (British India) officers
People from Karachi
Ambassadors of Pakistan to Sweden
High Commissioners of Pakistan to India
High Commissioners of Pakistan to the United Kingdom
Ambassadors of Pakistan to Czechoslovakia
Ambassadors of Pakistan to Russia
Tyabji family